Cymbidium erythrostylum, the red column cymbidium, is a species of orchid.

erythrostylum